Livio La Padula (born 20 November 1985) is an Italian rower. He competed in the men's lightweight coxless four event at the 2016 Summer Olympics. La Padula is an athlete of the Gruppo Sportivo Fiamme Oro.

References

External links
 

1985 births
Living people
Italian male rowers
Olympic rowers of Italy
Rowers at the 2016 Summer Olympics
Place of birth missing (living people)
World Rowing Championships medalists for Italy
Rowers of Fiamme Oro